William D. Chandler (August 5, 1930 – March 7, 1991) was a Canadian ice hockey player with the Lethbridge Maple Leafs. He won a gold medal at the 1951 World Ice Hockey Championships in Paris, France. The 1951 Lethbridge Maple Leafs team was inducted to the Alberta Sports Hall of Fame in 1974. He also played with the Lethbridge Native Sons.

References

1930 births
1991 deaths
Canadian ice hockey left wingers
Sportspeople from Regina, Saskatchewan
Ice hockey people from Saskatchewan